Surendra Prasad Sinha is an Indian politician. He was elected to the Bihar Legislative Assembly from Gurua constituency in Bihar in the 2010 Bihar Legislative Assembly election as a member of the Bharatiya Janata Party.

References

1956 births
Living people
Bharatiya Janata Party politicians from Bihar
People from Gaya district
Bihar MLAs 2010–2015